South Carolina Highway 73 (SC 73) was a state highway that existed in central portions of Allendale County. It connected the Georgia state line with Sycamore, via Allendale.

Route description
SC 32 began at the Georgia state line, southwest of Allendale, where it continued as SC 73. It proceeded to the northeast. It had an intersection with SC 631 (now SC 3) before it reached Allendale. In the town, it first met SC 337 (now Bluff Road). Then, in rapid succession, it intersected SC 3's then-current path (now partially US 278) and SC 28's then-current path (now US 278 and SC 125). Just northeast of Allendale, it met the southern terminus of SC 508 (now US 301). It then proceeded to Sycamore, where it reached its eastern terminus, an intersection with SC 5 (now US 321) and what was then the western terminus of SC 641.

History
SC 73 was established in 1942 as a renumbering of the original SC 331. It was decommissioned in 1947. Most of its path became part of US 301 from the state line to Allendale and part of an extended SC 641 from there to Sycamore

Major intersections

See also

References

External links
Former SC 73 at the Virginia Highways South Carolina Annex

073 (1940s)
Transportation in Allendale County, South Carolina
U.S. Route 301